William Hurrell Mallock (7 February 18492 April 1923) was an English novelist and economics writer.  Much of his writing is in support of the Roman Catholic Church and in opposition to positivist philosophy and socialism.

Biography

A nephew of the historian Froude, he was educated privately and then at Balliol College, Oxford. He won the Newdigate Prize in 1872 for his poem The Isthmus of Suez and took a second class in the final classical schools in 1874, securing his Bachelor of Arts degree from Oxford University. Mallock never entered a profession, though at one time he considered the diplomatic service. He attracted considerable attention by his satirical novel, The New Republic (1877), conceived while he was a student at Oxford, in which he introduced characters easily recognized as such prominent individuals as Benjamin Jowett, Matthew Arnold, Violet Fane, Thomas Carlyle, and Thomas Henry Huxley. Although the book was not well received by critics at first, it did cause instant scandal, particularly concerning the portrait of literary scholar Walter Pater:

Moreover, Pater was the subject of a cruel satire in W. H. Mallock's The New Republic which was published in Belgravia in 1876-7 and in book form in 1877. He appeared there as 'Mr. Rose'—an effete, impotent, sensualist with a perchant for erotic literature and beautiful young men.

Mallock's book appeared during the competition for the Oxford Professorship of Poetry and played a role in convincing Pater to remove himself from consideration. A few months later Pater published what may have been a subtle riposte: "A Study of Dionysus: The Spiritual Form of Fire and Dew."

His keen logic and gift for acute exposition and criticism were displayed in later years both in fiction and in controversial works. In a series of books dealing with religious questions he insisted on dogma as the basis of religion and on the impossibility of founding religion on purely scientific data. In Is Life Worth Living? (1879) and the satirical novel The New Paul and Virginia (1878) he attacked positivist theories and defended the Roman Catholic Church; one of his uncles, Hurrell Froude, had been a founder of the Oxford Movement.

In a volume on the intellectual position of the Church of England, Doctrine and Doctrinal Disruption (1900), he advocated the necessity of a strictly defined creed. Later volumes on similar topics were Religion as a Credible Doctrine (1903) and The Reconstruction of Belief (1905). He also authored articles, being a frequent contributor to many newspapers and magazines, including The Forum, National Review, Public Opinion, Contemporary Review, and Harper’s Weekly. One in particular, directed against Thomas Huxley's agnosticism, appeared in the April 1889 issue of The Fortnightly Review, being Mallock's response to a controversy between, among others, Huxley and William Connor Magee, the Bishop of Peterborough.

He published several works on economics, directed against radical and socialist theories: Social Equality (1882), Property and Progress (1884), Labour and the Popular Welfare (1893), Classes and Masses (1896), Aristocracy and Evolution (1898), and A Critical Examination of Socialism (1908) – and later visited the United States in order to deliver a series of lectures on the subject:

The Civic Federation of New York, an influential body which aims, in various ways, at harmonising apparently divergent industrial interests in America, having decided on supplementing its other activities by a campaign of political and economic education, invited me, at the beginning of the year 1907, to initiate a scientific discussion of socialism in a series of lectures or speeches, to be delivered under the auspices of certain of the great Universities in the United States. This invitation I accepted, but, the project being a new one, some difficulty arose as to the manner in which it might best be carried out – whether the speeches or lectures should in each case be new, dealing with some fresh aspect of the subject, or whether they should be arranged in a single series to be repeated without substantial alteration in each of the cities visited by me. The latter plan was ultimately adopted, as tending to render the discussion of the subject more generally comprehensible to each local audience. A series of five lectures,Hillquit, Morris (1907). Mr. Mallock's "Ability". New York: Socialist Literature Co. substantially the same, was accordingly delivered by me in New York, Cambridge, Chicago, Philadelphia, and Baltimore.

Among his anti-socialist works should be classed his novel, The Old Order Changes (1886). His other novels are A Romance of the Nineteenth Century (1881), A Human Document (1892), The Heart of Life (1895), Tristram Lacy (1899), The Veil of the Temple (1904), and An Immortal Soul (1908).

Mallock is given prominent space in Russell Kirk's The Conservative Mind:

Mallock is remembered chiefly for one book, The New Republic, and that his first, composed while he still was at Oxford – "the most brilliant novel ever written by an undergraduate," says Professor Tillotson, justly. ... But other books of Mallock's are worth looking into still—his theological and philosophical studies, his didactic novels, his zealous volumes of political expostulation and social statistics, even his books of verse.

"He had astonishing acuteness, great argumentative power, wide and accurate knowledge, excellent style," Saintsbury says of Mallock. "He might have seemed—he did seem, I believe, to some—to have in him the making of an Aristophanes or a Swift of not so much lessened degree... And yet after the chiefly scandalous success of The New Republic he never 'came off.' To attribute this to the principles he advocated is to nail on those who dislike those principles their own favourite gibe of 'the stupid party.'" ... In the past two or three years, interest in Mallock has revived somewhat, probably stimulated by that conservative revival for which Mallock hoped, and the lines of which he predicted. Is Life Worth Living?, Social Equality, and The Limits of Pure Democracy, together with Mallock's charming autobiography, are especially deserving of attention from anyone interested in the conservative mind. Mallock died in 1923, half forgotten even then; but he has had no equal among English conservative thinkers since. He spent his life in a struggle against moral and political radicalism: for bulk and thoroughness, quite aside from Mallock's gifts of wit and style, his work is unexcelled among the body of conservative writings in any country. ...

(H)e accomplished unassisted what the research staff of the Conservative Political Centre now carries on as a body. "Throughout almost all his books is to be noticed the aspiration after a Truth which will give the soul something more than 'a dusty answer'; it is everywhere evident," says Sir John Squire. In the search for this truth, he assailed some of the most formidable personages of his day – Huxley, Spencer, Jowett, Kidd, Webb, Shaw. And none of these writers, not even Bernard Shaw, came off well from a bout with Mallock.

He published a volume of Poems in 1880. His 1878 book Lucretius included some verse translations from the Roman poet, which he followed with Lucretius on Life and Death in 1900, a book of verse paraphrases in a style modeled after the Rubaiyat of Omar Khayyam by Edward FitzGerald. (A second edition was issued in 1910.)

Influence and legacy
Ironically, this last work came to be highly regarded by freethinkers and other religious skeptics. Corliss Lamont includes portions of the third canto in his A Humanist Funeral Service. Mallock himself, in his introduction, seems to be offering it, somewhat condescendingly, for the use of such non-Christians when he writes:Those, however, who... are adherents of the principles which [Lucretius] shares with the latest scientists of to-day, can hardly find the only hope which is open to them expressed by any writer with a loftier and more poignant dignity than that with which they will find it expressed by the Roman disciple of Epicurus.

Artist Tom Phillips used Mallock's A Human Document as the basis for his project A Humument, in which he took a copy of the novel and constructed a work of art using its pages.

The popular English novelist Ouida (Maria Louise Ramé) dedicated her book of essays Views and Opinions (1895) to Mallock—"To W. H. Mallock. As a slight token of personal regard and intellectual admiration."

Works

 Every Man his Own Poet. Oxford: T. Shrimpton & Son, 1872.
 The New Republic; or, Culture, Faith, and Philosophy in an English Country House, Vol. 2. London: Chatto and Windus, 1877 (Rep. Leicester University Press, 1975).
 The New Paul and Virginia, or Positivism on an Island. London: Chatto & Windus, 1878.
 Is Life Worth Living? London: Chatto & Windus, 1879.
 Poems. London: Chatto & Windus, 1880.
 A Romance of the Nineteenth Century, 2 Vol. London: Chatto & Windus, 1881.
 Social Equality, a Short Study in a Missing Science. London: Richard Bentley & Son, 1882.
 Atheism and the Value of Life. London: Richard Bentley and Son, 1884.
 Property and Progress, or, A brief Enquiry into Contemporary Social Agitation in England. London: John Murray, 1884.
 The Old Order Changes, Vol. 2, Vol. 3. London: John Murray, 1886.
 Lucretius. London: William Blackwood & Sons, 1887.
 In an Enchanted Island: or, A Winter's Retreat in Cyprus. London: Richard Bentley & Son, 1889.
 A Human Document – A Novel, Vol. 2, Vol. 3. London: Chapman & Hall, 1892.
 Verses. London: Hutchinson & Co., 1893.
 Labour and the Popular Welfare. London: Adam & Charles Black, 1893.
 The Heart of Life, Vol. 2, Vol. 3. London: Chapman & Hall, 1895.
 Studies of Contemporary Superstition. London: Ward & Downey Limited, 1895.
 Classes and Masses, or, Wealth, Wages, and Welfare in the United Kingdom. London: Adam & Charles Black, 1896.
 Socialism and Social Discord. London: Published at the Central Offices of the Liberty and Property Defense League, 1896.
 Aristocracy and Evolution: A Study of the Rights, the Origin, and the Social Functions of the Wealthier Classes. London: Adam & Charles Black, 1898.
 Tristram Lacy, or the Individualist. London: Chapman & Hall, 1899.
 Lucretius on Life and Death. London: Adam & Charles Black, 1900.
 Doctrine and Doctrinal Disruption. London: Adam & Charles Blackie, 1900.
 Religion as Credible Doctrine: A Study of the Fundamental Difficulty. New York: The Macmillan Company, 1903.
 The Fiscal Dispute Made Easy; or, A Key to the Principles Involved in the Opposite Policies. London: Eveleigh Nash, 1903.
 The Veil of the Temple; or, From Dark to Twilight. London: John Murray, 1904.
 The Reconstruction of Belief. London: Chapman & Hall (Rep. as The Reconstruction of Religious Belief. New York: Harper & Brothers, 1905).
 Socialism. New York: The National Civic Federation, 1907.
 A Critical Examination Of Socialism. London: John Murray, 1908.
 Short Epitome of Eight Lectures on Some of the Principal Fallacies of Socialism. J. Truscott, 1908.
 An Immortal Soul. London: George Bells & Sons, 1908.
 The Nation as a Business Firm, an Attempt to Cut a Path Through Jungle. London: Adam & Charles Black, 1910.
 Social Reform as Related to Realities and Delusions; an Examination of the Increase and Distribution of Wealth from 1801 to 1910. London: John Murray, 1914.
 The Limits of Pure Democracy. London: Chapman & Hall. London, 1918 (1st Pub. 1917).
 Democracy; being an Abridged Edition of 'The Limits of Pure Democracy', with an introduction by the Duke of Northumberland. London: Chapman & Hall, ltd., 1924.
 Capital, War & Wages, Three Questions in Outline. London: Blackie & Son Limited, 1918.
 Memoirs of Life and Literature. New York: Harper & Brothers Publishers, 1920.

As editor
 Letters, Remains, and Memoirs of Edward Adolphus Seymour, Twelfth Duke of Somerset, with Helen Guendolen Seymour Ramsden. London: Richard Bentley & Son, 1893.

Articles

 "Prophets and Poets," Dark Blue, Vol. XIV, April 1871.
 "The Golden Ass of Apuleius," Fraser's Magazine, New Series, Vol. XIV, July/December, 1876.
 "Seneca's Œdipus," The Gentleman's Magazine, Vol. CCXL, January/June, 1877.
 "Modern Atheism – Its Attitude Towards Morality," The Contemporary Review, Vol. XXIX, January, 1877.
 "Is Life Worth Living?," The Nineteenth Century, Vol. II, August/December, 1877; Part II (conclusion), Vol. III, January/June, 1878.
 "The Future of Faith," The Contemporary Review, Vol. XXXI, March 1878.
 "Positivism on an Island," The Contemporary Review, Vol. XXXII, April 1878.
 "A Familiar Colloquy on Recent Art," The Nineteenth Century, Vol. IV, July/December, 1878.
 "Faith and Verification," The Nineteenth Century, Vol. IV, July/December, 1878.
 "Dogma and Morality," The Nineteenth Century, Vol. IV, July/December, 1878.
 "The Logic of Toleration," The Nineteenth Century, Vol. V, January/June, 1879.
 "Intolerance and Persecution," Appleton's Journal, Vol. VI, No. 32, February 1879.
 "A Dialogue on Human Happiness," The Nineteenth Century, Vol. VI, July/December, 1879.
 "Impressions of Theophrastus Such, by George Elliott," The Edinburgh Review, Vol. CL, October 1879.
 "Atheistic Methodism," The Nineteenth Century, Vol. VII, January/June, 1880.
 "Atheism and the Rights of Man," The Nineteenth Century, Vol. VII, January/June, 1880.
 "Atheism and Repentance – A Familiar Colloquy," The Nineteenth Century, Vol. VIII, July/December, 1880.
 "The Philosophy of Conservatism," The Nineteenth Century, Vol. VIII, July/December, 1880.
 "Civilization and Equality – A Familiar Colloquy," The Contemporary Review, Vol. XL, October, 1881.
 "A Missing Science," The Contemporary Review, Vol. XL, December, 1881.
 "Radicalism – A Familiar Colloquy," The Nineteenth Century, Vol. IX, January/June, 1881.
 "The Functions of Wealth," The Contemporary Review, Vol. XLI, February, 1882.
 "The Radicalism of the Marketplace," National Review, Vol. I, June 1883.
 "English Radicalism and the People," National Review, Vol. I, 1883.
 "Radicalism and the Working Classes," National Review, Vol. II, September 1883.
 "Conservatism and Socialism," The National Review, Vol. II, 1883.
 "Landlords and the National Income," The National Review, Vol. II, 1883.
 "Conversations With a Solitary," The North American Review, Vol. CXXXIV, No. 306, May, 1882; Part II, Vol. CXXXVII, No. 322, September, 1883; Part III, Vol. CXXXVII, No. 324, November, 1883.
 "How to Popularize Unpopular Political Truths," National Review, Vol. VI, 1885.
 "The Old Order Changes," National Review, Vol. VI, 1885.
 "The Convalescence of Faith," The Forum, Vol. II, 1886.
 "Faith and Physical Science," The Forum, Vol. II, 1886.
 "Notes on Mr. Hyndman's 'Reply'," Fortnightly Review, Vol. XLI, 1887.
 "Wealth and the Working Classes," Fortnightly Review, Vol. XLI, 1887.
 "What is the Object of Life?," The Forum, Vol. III, August 1887.
 "Values and Prices," The Library Magazine, Vol. III, April/June, 1887.
 "Qualities of the Bourgeoisie," Fortnightly Review, 1887.
 "Scientific Prospects of Labor," Fortnightly Review, 1887.
 "Conservatism and the Diffusion of Property," National Review, Vol. XI, 1888.
 "Poverty, Sympathy and Economics," The Forum, Vol. V, 1888.
 "Scenes in Cyprus," Scribner's Magazine, September 1888.
 "Radicals and the Unearned Increment," National Review, Vol. XIII, 1889.
 "Science and the Revolution," Fortnightly Review, Vol. LII, 1889.
 "The Scientific Basis of Optimism," Fortnightly Review, Vol. XLV, 1889.
 "Cowardly Agnosticism, a Word with Prof. Huxley," Fortnightly Review, April 1889.
 "The Conditions of Great Poetry," Quarterly Review, Vol. 192, 1900.
 "Mr. Labouchere: The Democrat," Fortnightly Review, Vol. LIII, 1890.
 "Reason Alone: A Reply to Father Sebastian Bowden," Fortnightly Review, Vol. LIV, 1890.
 "A Catholic Theologian on Natural Religion," Fortnightly Review, Vol. LIV, 1890.
 "Qualities of the Bourgeoisie," Fortnightly Review, Vol. XLVIII, 1890.
 "Scientific Prospects of Labor," Fortnightly Review, Vol. XLVIII, 1890.
 "The Rights of the Weak," National Review, 1890.
 "Through Three Civilizations," Scribner's Magazine, February 1890.
 "The Relation of Art to Truth," The Forum, Vol. IX, March 1890.
 "The Individualist Ideal," The New Review, Vol. IV, No. 21, 1891.
 "A Human Document," Fortnightly Review, Vol. LVI, 1891.
 "Public Life and Private Morals," Fortnightly Review, Vol. LV, 1891.
 "Trade-Unionism and Utopia," The Forum, Vol. XI, April 1891.
 "Wanted: A New Corrupt Practices Act," National Review, Vol. XX, 1892.
 "Amateur Christianity," Fortnightly Review, Vol. LVII, 1892.
 "Poetry and Lord Lytton," Fortnightly Review, Vol. LVII, 1892.
 "The Souls," Fortnightly Review, Vol. LII, 1892.
 "Le Style C'est L'Homme," The New Review, Vol. VI, 1892. 
 "Lady Jeune on London Society," The North American Review, July 1892.
 "Are Scott, Dickens, and Thackeray Obsolete?," The Forum, December 1892.
 "The Divisibility of Wealth," New Review, Vol. VIII, 1893
 "A Common Ground of Agreement for All Parties," The National Review, Vol. XXI, 1893.
 "The Causes of the National Income," The National Review, Vol. XXI, 1893.
 "Capital: Fixed and Circulating," The National Review, Vol. XXI, 1893.
 "Wealth, Labour and Ability," The National Review, Vol. XXI, 1893.
 "The Future Income of Labour," The National Review, Vol. XXI, 1893.
 "The Spontaneous Diffusion of Wealth," The National Review, Vol. XXI, 1893.  
 "Social Remedies of the Labor Party," Fortnightly Review, Vol. LIII, 1893.
 "Conservatism and Democracy," Quarterly Review, Vol. CLXXVI, January/April 1893.
 "Who Are the Greatest Wealth Producers?," The North American Review, June 1893.
 "The Productivity of the Individual," The North American Review, November 1893.
 "Socialist in a Corner," Fortnightly Review, Vol. LV, 1894.
 "Fabian Economics," Fortnightly Review, Vol. LV, 1894.
 "Heart of Life," Fortnightly Review, Vol. LVI, 1894.
 "How Socialism Differs From Individualism," Public Opinion, Vol. XVII, 1894.
 "The Minimum of Humane Living," Pall Mall Magazine, January 1894.
 "Fashion and Intellect," The North American Review, June 1894.
 "The Significance of Modern Poverty," The North American Review, September 1894.
 "Physics and Sociology," Contemporary Review, Vol. LXVIII, 1895.
 "Religion of Humanity," Nineteenth Century, Vol. XXXVIII, 1895.
 "The Census and the Condition of the People," The Pall Mall Magazine, Vol. V, January/April, 1895.
 "The Real 'Quintessence of Socialism'," The Forum, Vol. XIX, April 1895.
 "Is an Income Tax Socialistic?," The Forum, Vol. XIX, August 1895.
 "Demand and Supply under Socialism,"]The Forum, Vol. XX, October 1895.
 "Bimetallism and the Nature of Money," Fortnightly Review, Vol. LX, 1896.
 "Altruism in Economics," The Forum, August 1896.
 "Unrecognized Essence of Democracy," Fortnightly Review, Vol. LXII, 1897.
 "New Study of Natural Religion," Fortnightly Review, Vol. LXII, 1897.
 "The Buck-Jumping of Labor," The Nineteenth Century, XLII, No. 247, September 1897.
 "The Theoretical Foundation of Socialism: A Reply to Mr. Hyndman," Cosmopolis, Vol. IX, February 1898.
 "Does the Church of England Teach Anything?," The Nineteenth Century, Vol. XLIV, July/December, 1898.
 "Mr. Herbert Spencer in Self Defense," The Nineteenth Century, Vol. XLIV, July/December, 1898.
 "The Intellectual Future of Catholicism," Nineteenth Century, Vol. XLVI, 1899.
 "The Comedy of Christian Science," National Review, Vol. XXXIII, 1899.
 "The Limitations of Art," The Anglo-Saxon Review, Vol. V, June 1900.
 "A Squire’s Household in the Reign of George I," The Anglo-Saxon Review, Vol. VIII, March 1901.
 "Religion and Science," Part II, Fortnightly Review, September/November 1901.
 "A New Light on the Bacon-Shakespeare Cypher," The Nineteenth Century and After, Vol. L, July/December 1901.
 "The Alleged Economic Decay of Great Britain," The Monthly Review, Vol. VI, 1902.
 "Mrs. Gallup’s Cypher Story – Bacon-Shakespeare-Pope," The Nineteenth Century and After, Vol. LI, January/June, 1902.
 "The Latest Shipwreck of Metaphysics," The Nineteenth Century and After, Vol. LI, January/June, 1902.
 "Last Words on Mrs. Gallup’s Alleged Cypher," The Nineteenth Century and After, Vol. LII, July/December, 1902.
 "The Myth of the Big and Little Loaf," Fortnightly Review, Vol. LXXIV, 1903.
 "The Secret of Carlyle's Life," Fortnightly Review, Vol. LXXIX, 1903.
 "The Gospel of Mr. F. W. H. Myers," The Nineteenth Century and After, Vol. LIII, January/June 1893.
 "New Facts Relating to the Bacon – Shakespeare Question," Part II, The Pall Mall Magazine, Vol. XXIX, January/April, 1903.
 "The Great Fiscal Problem," The Nineteenth Century and After, Vol. LIV, July/December, 1903.
 "Free Thought in the Church of England," The Nineteenth Century and After, Vol. LVI, September 1904.
 "Free Thought in the Church of England, a Rejoinder," The Nineteenth Century and After, July/December, 1904.
 "Reconstruction of Belief," The Contemporary Review, Vol. LXXXVII, April 1905.
 "Through Matter and Mind," The Contemporary Review, Vol. LXXXVIII, July 1905.
 "Science and Immortality: A Reply," The North American Review, October 1905.
 "Two Attacks on Science," Fortnightly Review, Vol. LXXXIV, August 1905.
 "Sir Oliver Lodge on Religion and Science," Fortnightly Review, Vol. LXXXIV, November 1905.
 "Christianity as a Natural Religion," The Nineteenth Century and After, Vol. LVIII, July/December, 1905.
 "A Guide to the 'Statistical Abstract'," The Nineteenth Century and After, Vol. LVIII, July/December, 1905.
 "Lodge on Life and Matter," Fortnightly Review, Vol. LXXXVI, July 1906.
 "Great Fortunes and the Community," The North American Review, Vol. CLXXXIII, No. 598, September, 1906.
 "The Expatriation of Capital," The Nineteenth Century and After, Vol. LIX, January/June, 1906.
 "Two Poet Laureates on Life," National Review, August 1906 [Rep. in The Living Age, Vol. CCLI, October 1906].
 "The Political Powers of Labour – Their Extent and Their Limitations," The Nineteenth Century and After, Vol. LX, July/December, 1906.
 "A Critical Examination of Socialism," The North American Review, No. 613, 19 April 1907; No. 614, 3 May 1907; No. 615, 17 May 1907; No. 616, 7 June 1907.
 "First Impressions of America," The Outlook, Vol. LXXXVI, June 1907.
 "Christian Socialism," Putnam's Monthly, Vol. III, October, 1907/March, 1908.
 "Persuasive Socialism," The Nineteenth Century and After, Vol. LXIII, January/June, 1908.
 "Correspondence – Mr. Mallock Replies," The New Age, Vol. II, No. 23, 11 April 1908.
 "A Century of Socialistic Experiments," The Dublin Review, Vol. CXLV, No. 290-291, July/October, 1909.
 "The Missing Essentials in Economic Science," Part II, The Nineteenth Century and After, Vol. LXV, January/June, 1909; Part III, Vol. LXVI, July/December, 1909.
 "Phantom Millions," The Nineteenth Century and After, Vol. LXVI, July/December, 1909.
 "The Possibilities of an Income Tax According with the Scheme of Pitt," The Nineteenth Century and After, Vol. LXVI, March 1910.
 "The Facts at the Back of Unemployment," The Nineteenth Century and After, Vol. LXIX, January/June, 1911.
 "Socialistic Ideas and Practical Politics," The Nineteenth Century and After, April 1912.
 "Labour Unrest as a Subject of Official Investigation," The Nineteenth Century and After, Vol. LXXI, 1912.
 "The Intellectual Bankruptcy of Socialism," The National Review, August 1912.
 "Women in Parliament," Nineteenth Century and After, Vol. LXXII, 1912.
 "The Social Data of Radicalism," Nineteenth Century and After, Vol. LXXIII, 1913.
 "A Catholic Critique of Current Social Theories," The Dublin Review, Vol. CLV, No. 311, July 1914.
 "War Expenditure of the United Kingdom," Fortnightly Review, Vol. CIV, August 1915.
 "Cost of War, the Limits of Supertaxation," Nineteenth Century and After, Vol. LXXVIII, September 1915.
 "The Distribution of Incomes," The North American Review, June 1916.
 "Capital and the Cost of the War," Nineteenth Century and After, Vol. LXXXIII, January 1918.
 "Memories of Men and Places," Harper's Weekly, May/June, 1920.

Translations
 "Lucretius on Life and Death," The Anglo-Saxon Review, Vol. III, December 1899.
 "The Bridal Hymns of Catullus," The Anglo-Saxon Review, Vol. VII, December 1900.

See also
 John Henry Newman
 Russell Kirk
 William Allingham

References

Further reading

 Adams, Amy Belle (1934). The Novels of William Hurrell Mallock. University of Maine Studies, Second Series, No. 30. Orono: University of Maine Press.
 Bain, James Tom (1972). The Social Conservatism of W.H. Mallock. Thesis (M.A.): Tulane University.
 Brown, Douglas P. (2004). The Formation of the Thought of a Young English Conservative: W. H. Mallock and the Contest for Cultural and Socio-Economic Authority, 1849-1884. PhD dissertation, University of Missouri.
 Buckley, Jerome (1964). The Victorian Temper. New York: Vintage Books.
 Burn, W. L. (1949). "English Conservatism," The Nineteenth Century, Vol. CXLV, pp. 1–11, 67–76.
 Coker, Francis W. (1933). "Mallock, William, H. 1849-1923." In: Encyclopedia of the Social Sciences. Ed. by Edwin R.A. Seligman & Alvin Johnson, Vol. X. London: Macmillan & Co., pp. 66–67.
 Denisoff, Dennis (2001). "The Leering Creatures of W. H. Mallock and Vernon Lee." In: Aestheticism and Sexual Parody: 1840-1940. Cambridge University Press.
 Douglas, Roy (2003). "Mallock and the 'Most Elaborate Answer'," The American Journal of Economics and Sociology, Vol. LXII, No. 5, pp. 117–136.
 Eccleshall, Robert (1990). English Conservatism Since the Restoration: An Introduction & Anthology. London: Unwin Hyman.
 Gartner, Russell R. (1979). William Hurrell Mallock: An Intellectual Biography. PhD dissertation, City University of New York.
 Egedy, Gergely (2004). "Conservatism versus Socialism. The late-Victorian Prophet of Inequality, Mallock," Tarsadalomkutatas (Social Science Research), Vol. XXII, No. 1, pp. 147–161.
 Hobson, John A. (1898). "Mr. Mallock as Political Economists," The Contemporary Review, Vol. LXXIII, pp. 528–539.
 Ingalls, Joshua King (1885). Social Wealth: The Sole Factors and Exact Ratios in its Acquirement and Apportionment. New York: Social Science Pub. Co.
 Jennings, Jeremy (1991). "Masses, Démocratie et Aristocratie dans le Pensée Politique en Angleterre," Mil Neuf Cent, Vol. IX, No. 9, pp. 99–112.
 Jarrett-Keer, Martim (1985). "W. H. Mallock: Radical Tory, Romantic Classicist," PN Review, Vol. XI, No. 5.
 Kearney, Anthony (2012). "W. H. Mallock's Jenkinson and Thomas Love Peacock's Jenkison; a Likely Connection," Notes and Queries, Vol. LIX, No. 3, pp. 387–390.
 Kirk, Russell (1982). The Portable Conservative Reader. New York: Viking Press.
 Krueger, Christine L. (2003). "Mallock, William Hurrell, 1849-1923." In: Encyclopedia of British Writers, 19th and 20th Centuries. New York: Facts on File Inc., 223–224.
 Leon, Daniel De (1908). "Marx on Mallock," Daily People, Vol. VIII, No. 245.
 Lucas, John (1971). "Conservatism and Revolution in the 1880s." In: Literature and Politics in the Nineteenth Century. London: Taylor & Francis, pp. 173–219.
 Lutzi, Pearl Antoinette (1917). The Social and Religious Ideas of W. H. Mallock. Thesis (M.A.): University of California.
 McCandless, Amy Maureen Thompson (1970). Change and the Conservative: A Study of William Hurrell Mallock. Thesis (M.A.): University of Wisconsin-Madison.
 Muller, Jerry Z. (1997) Conservatism: An Anthology of Social and Political Thought from David Hume to the Present. Princeton University Press.
 Nickerson, Charles C. (1963). "A Bibliography of the Novels of W. H. Mallock," English Literature in Transition, 1880-1920, Vol. VI, No. 4, pp. 190–198.
 Peters, J. N. (2004). "William Hurrell Mallock." In: H.C.G. Matthew & Brian Harrison (eds.), Oxford Dictionary of National Biography, Vol. 36. Oxford: Oxford University Press, pp. 337–338.
 Ramos, Iolanda (2006). "Clues to Utopia in W. H. Mallock’s The New Republic," Spaces of Utopia: An Electronic Journal, No. 2, pp. 28–41.
 Reichert, William O. (1956). The Conservative Mind of William Hurrell Mallock, PhD dissertation, University of Minnesota.
 Scott, Patrick G. (1971). "Mallock and Clough – A Correction," Nineteenth Century Fiction, Vol. XXVI, No. 3, pp. 347–348.
 Scott, T. H. S. (1897). Social Transformations of the Victorian Age. New York: Charles Scribner's Sons.
 Sitwell, Osbert. Laughter in the Next Room. Boston: Little, Brown, & Company.
 Spargo, John (1907). Modern Socialism. Chicago: Charles H. Kerr & Company.
 Thorne, W. H. (1893). "The Mallock Light," The Globe, Vol. IV, No. 13, August/November, pp. 459–468.
 Todd, Arthur James (1926). Theories of Social Progress. New York: The Macmillan Company.
 Tucker, Albert V. (1962). "W. H. Mallock and Late Victorian Conservatism," University of Toronto Quarterly, Vol. XXXI, No. 2, pp. 223–241.
 Wallace, George (1908). "Cause and Growth of Socialism." In: The Disinherited. Observations in Travel. New York: J.S. Ogilvie Publishing Company.
 Williams, Raymond (1960). "W. H. Mallock." In: Culture & Society 1780-1950. New York: Anchor Books.
 Wilshire, Gaylord (1907). Socialism – The Mallock-Wilshire Argument. New York: Wilshire Book Co.
 Woodring, Carl (1947). "William H. Mallock: A Neglected Wit," More Books, Vol. XII.
 Woodring, Carl (1951). "Notes on Mallock's 'The New Republic'," Nineteenth Century Fiction, Vol. VI, pp. 71–74.
 Wolff, Robert Lee (1977). Gains and Losses: Novels of Faith and Doubt in Victorian England. New York and London: Garland Publishing.
 Yarker, P. M. (1955). "Voltaire Among the Positivists: A Study of W. H. Mallock's The New Paul and Virginia." In: Essays and Studies. London: John Murray.
 Yarker, P. M. (1959). "W. H. Mallock's Other Novels," Nineteenth-Century Fiction, Vol. XIV, No. 3, pp. 189–205.

External links

 
 
 
 Works by William Hurrell Mallock, at Google Books
 Works by William Hurrell Mallock, at Hathi Trust
 

English religious writers
19th-century English novelists
20th-century English novelists
English economists
1849 births
1923 deaths
People from Teignbridge (district)
Alumni of Balliol College, Oxford
English male novelists
19th-century English male writers
20th-century English male writers
English male non-fiction writers